This is a list of mayors of the Council of the Municipality of Lane Cove, a local government area in the north shore region of Sydney, New South Wales, Australia. The Council was first incorporated on 11 February 1895. From inception until 2017, the Mayor was elected annually by the elected councillors. Since 2017, the Mayor is elected for a two-year term, with the Deputy Mayor for one year, by the Councillors at the first meeting of the Council. The Mayor of Lane Cove Council since 10 January 2022 is Cr. Andrew Zbik, the first mayor of Lane Cove representing the Australian Labor Party. The Mayor is assisted in their work by a Deputy Mayor, who is elected on an annual basis by the elected Councillors.

Mayors
The following individuals have served as Mayor of the Council of the Municipality of Lane Cove, or any of its predecessor titles:

See also

Local government areas of New South Wales

References

Lane Cove
Mayors Lane Cove
Mayors of Lane Cove